Walter Jankuhn (14 July 1888 - 22 May 1953) was a German classical tenor. He also played the main role in the film It's You I Have Loved.

Selected filmography

References

External links 

1888 births
1953 deaths
Musicians from Königsberg
German tenors
German male film actors
20th-century German male opera singers